Nesbrygga (or Nesbryggen) is a village and statistical area (grunnkrets) in Nøtterøy municipality, Norway.

The statistical area Nesbrygga, which also can include the peripheral parts of the village as well as the surrounding countryside, has a population of 940.

The village Nesbrygga is located north of Duken and south of the island Føynland. It is considered a part of the urban settlement Tønsberg, which covers the greater Tønsberg city area as well as the northern and eastern part of Nøtterøy. The urban settlement Tønsberg has a population of 45,447, of which 15,818 people live within Nøtterøy.

References

Villages in Vestfold og Telemark
Tønsberg